The Seaton Tramway is a  narrow gauge electric tramway in the East Devon district of South West England. The  route runs alongside the Axe Estuary and the River Coly, running between the coastal resort of Seaton, the village of Colyford, and the ancient town of Colyton. For much of its route, it operates between the estuary and the Seaton Wetlands nature reserves, offering views of the wildlife of both.

The tramway operates over part of the former Seaton Branch Line, which closed in March 1966. It was established in 1970 by Claude Lane, founder of Modern Electric Tramways Ltd, which had previously operated in Eastbourne between 1954 and 1969. Fourteen tramcars are part of the visitor attraction, which sees over 100,000 visitors per year. All of the tramcars are based on classic British designs, and vary in size between half-scale (1:2) and two thirds-scale (2:3). Most were built from scratch by Claude Lane and/or his successor Allan Gardner, but three were rebuilt from full-size cars which originally ran in London, Bournemouth and Exeter.

History

At St Leonards, Rhyl and Eastbourne
Claude Lane was the owner of the Lancaster Electrical Company of Barnet, a manufacturer of battery electric vehicles. His hobby was trams, and in 1949 he constructed a fully portable  gauge tram system that he initially displayed at garden fetes, and then with semi-permanent sites at St Leonards-on-Sea in 1951 and Rhyl from 1952 to 1957. Lane established Modern Electric Tramways Ltd as the parent company for the new venture.

By 1957 it was clear that the new line was a success, and the Rhyl operation was closed in order to concentrate all efforts on Eastbourne. Over the next nine years, cars 6, 7, 4, 2 & 12 were constructed. By the mid 1960s, it became apparent that the lease at Eastbourne would not be renewed, and so Lane sought a freehold site for a longer line, which would be laid to a wider 2 ft 9in gauge. This was as wide as the 2 ft cars could be regauged, while allowing for larger cars to be built in the future, the first of which was Car 8 in 1968.

At Seaton
The Beeching Axe was in full swing and the railway branch line to Seaton was closed in 1966. Negotiations to purchase the site from British Rail, and then to obtain the necessary Light Railway Order, took some time and was not granted until December 1969. Relocation from Eastbourne to Seaton took place over the winter of 1969/70.

The new line opened on 28 August 1970, just in time for the end of the holiday season. It was laid to the new 2 ft 9in gauge, with Car 8 operating the first departures. This initial opening was very limited: the line only went as far as the newly christened 'Bobsworth Bridge', named after the inaugural one shilling fare. The overhead electrical supply was yet to be installed, so as a temporary measure each tram was coupled to a battery trailer. Services closed again in September 1970, to allow further work to be completed including the extension to Colyford, erection of overhead traction poles and the gauge conversion of other rolling stock.

Claude Lane suffered a heart attack and died on 2 April 1971, just before the Tramway was due to open for the new season. He died without a will in place, but his nephew Roger persuaded the rest of the Lane family to keep the family money invested, thus allowing the company to continue. Roger Lane joined the Board of Directors, and Claude's long-time assistant Allan Gardner was appointed Managing Director. In addition, a large number of volunteers offered their help to complete the tramway, and weekend working parties came to Seaton throughout the 1970s to assist with large-scale work on the track and overhead, and several volunteers gave their expertise to assist with specialist technical projects.

The years 1971 to 1980 were a time of swift expansion. The overhead electrical supply was completed in 1973, and in May 1975 an extension from Riverside Depot to Harbour Road was opened, which gave the Tramway a more visible presence in the centre of the town. Attention then turned towards the extension of the line from Colyford to Colyton. A marathon all-night working party in 1975 excavated the old branch line rail from the level crossing at Colyford, and by the following morning had replaced it with grooved tram rail. Over the next three years, most of the track and overhead wire was put in place, but in 1978 a flash flood just to the north of Colyford washed away a considerable amount of the newly laid ballast, and it was not until 1980 that the extension to Colyton was finally opened.

In 1984, ex-Metropolitan Tramways car 94 (Seaton car 14) was launched, the first addition to the fleet for 16 years, and the inaugural trip was driven by comedian and TV personality Larry Grayson. In 1988, the Allan Gardner-designed Car 17 was built, and in 1992 ex-Bournemouth car 106 (renumbered 16 for Seaton) came into service. 1998 saw the restoration and relaunch of former Exeter tram 19. With the exception of car 17, these trams are enclosed single deck saloons, aimed at providing comfort during bad weather and also to extend the season. Indeed, the success of out of season special events such as the Polar Express resulted in the conversion of car 17 to a fully enclosed saloon in 2016, and it was re-numbered 15.

Between 2004 and 2007, three new cars to a standardised design based on elements from Plymouth and Blackburn tramcars were introduced, carrying numbers 9, 10 and 11.

In 2020 the tramway closed during the COVID-19 Lockdown, from 23 March and reopened again on 4th July. New health and safety procedures were introduced to ensure the tramway was 'Covid Secure' and operated on a reduced timetable. During the lockdown the tramway launched its 'Tramathon Live' appeal, hoping to raise money to ensure its future against any losses it made being closed. The appeal included a week of live videos on Facebook, streaming a Q and A, Riverside Depot tour, a line tour and finished the week going live and driving for a full 24 hours from 12 midday 11 June to 12 midday 12 June. The appeal was successful and raised over £30,000.

In 2020 the tramway also celebrated their 50th anniversary on 28 August. Planned celebrations were cancelled due to COVID-19 but the occasion was marked with some planned specials on trams 4 & 8. Car 8 recreated its first passenger service at 2:30pm between Riverside Depot and Bobsworth Bridge. The Charity was recipient of the Cultural Recovery Fund, provided by the government in response to the COVID-19 lockdown. The award was in the amount of £435,100 and went towards wages, maintenance and partners & exhibitions.

Route

Seaton tram station

Seaton tram station is the southern terminus of the Seaton Tramway. The station is situated in the town centre of the town of Seaton in the English county of Devon. The terminus at Seaton opened in 1975, and has since been entirely rebuilt twice. The most recent rebuilding has resulted in the construction of a modern enclosed building suitable for operation all-year round, and which acts as a venue for a range of tramway and community based events.

From Seaton tram station to the Riverside tram stop, the tramway follows a route, created in the 1970s, running first north by a number of curves to the marshland that lies inland of Seaton and then tuning east to run between the marshland and the town until it reaches the right of way of the former railway branch. At this point are found the line's depot, and the (currently closed) Riverside tram stop. This first stretch of line gives good views of Seaton Marshes, the most southerly of a string low-level nature reserves, collectively known as Seaton Wetlands and all of which are visible at some stage from the tram. Between them, these reserves include freshwater grazing marshes, intertidal lagoons, scrapes, ditches and bird hides, and are host to a diverse variety of birds and mammals such as otters.

Riverside Depot and Halt
From 1970 to 1975, when Seaton tram station first opened, the line's southern terminus was located at Riverside, just to the north of Riverside Depot. Riverside temporarily became the terminus again in 2017–2018, whilst the new Seaton station was under construction, during which time booking office facilities were provided through the location of tram 01 to the south of Riverside Depot. Riverside has fully surfaced platforms, and a passing loop, and is sometimes used out of season in connection with special events. In February 2020, a new decked extension was constructed, sited between the track and over the river bank, in preparation for Riverside's use as a permanent halt. Completion was delayed due to the effects of the COVID-19 lockdown, and the opening was postponed until 1st August 2022.

Seaton Wetlands Halt
From Riverside northwards, the tramway follows the old Seaton railway branch line. As far as Colyford, this ran on an embankment separating the Seaton Wetlands, to the west, and the Axe Estuary, to the east. The nature reserves of Seaton Marshes, Black Hole Marsh, Colyford Common and Stafford Marsh are all visible from the tram, as is the tidal estuary and the village of Axmouth on the far bank. 

Along this stretch there are two passing loops, known as Axmouth and Swans Nest. Work was undertaken to turn Swan's Next loop into a tram stop, known as Wetlands, which allows passengers direct access to the Seaton Wetlands nature reserves. Work was about to get underway when the COVID-19 lockdown came in to force, so work had to be postposed until winter 2021–2022. Wetlands stop was eventually opened on the same day as the Riverside stop (1st August 2022).

Colyford tram station

The station is located at the eastern end of Colyford village, adjacent to the White Hart Inn. There are surfaced platforms, and a passenger waiting shelter. The station includes the Colyford passing loop, and there is also a single siding. The railway station's original gentlemen's lavatory is still in its original position, but no longer in use. 

Immediately to the north of Colyford, the line crosses the A3052 road on a level crossing. For here the line rises gently, leaving the estuary and wetlands behind and running through farmland. There are two further passing loops, known as Tye Lane and Cownhayne, before Colyton tram station is reached.

Colyton tram station

Unlike the other stations on the tramway, Colyton still retains much of the feel of a former railway station. The original high platform and station buildings still exist, with the buildings housing the Tram Stop Restaurant, a shop and toilets, whilst the platform provides access to the buildings and outdoor tables for the restaurant. There is also a children's play area at the northern end of the track. The former track bed of the station now houses twin tram tracks which are set in block paving.

Operations 
Seaton Tramway is a single line system, with passing loops roughly every half mile. The trams run to a timetable which includes scheduled passes at designated passing loops. A single line token system operates between Seaton and Riverside, because this section contains four sharp curves which restrict the driver's line of sight. A two-way radio system is also used to keep drivers in touch with the duty inspector. The scheduled journey time from Seaton to Colyford is 15 minutes, and Colyford to Colyton is a further 12 minutes, making a total journey time of 27 minutes. Prior to the new halts at Riverside and Wetlands opening, the journey time was 23 minutes.

Seaton Tramway operates a daily service between Easter and the end of October, with a weekend-only service operating from mid-February until Easter. In addition, there are several out of season events, principally bird watching specials and Polar Express trips during December.

As of 2022, trams depart every 20 minutes in all services and is operated by a minimum of four trams (up to six in 'red' service). Additional departures are scheduled at peak times according to demand, which can raise the number of cars in service to seven or eight. Prior to 2022, trams would depart every 30 minutes, in 'Orange Service', operated by four cars.

It is possible for groups of 30 people or more to book a designated tram, which runs in tandem with one of the service cars. Individuals can also book a tram for a range of tram driving lessons and experiences.

A combination of paid and volunteer staff operate the Tramway. A small permanent staff is complemented by a large number of seasonal drivers, shop and cafe staff.

Fleet list

Tram cars

Works cars
The tramway also operates a number of works cars for transport and engineering functions. These include a number of freight wagons (flat beds, open drop-sides, and tipper wagons), and also specialist engineering vehicles such as a hydraulic hoist trailer (with cherry picker), overhead works trailer, and welding trailer.

The tramway formerly operated a diesel locomotive for works trains. This engine, Ruston and Hornsby 4wDM works number 435398 of 1959, was named Claude. The locomotive was disposed of in 2002, and moved to the Devon Railway Centre.

Gallery

References

External links 

 Official website of Seaton Tramway
 Seaton Tramway webcam from Railcam

2 ft 9 in gauge railways
Heritage railways in Devon
Tram transport in England
Tramways with double-decker trams